Dnieper Lowland is a major geographic feature of the Central Ukraine region and the East European Plain.

Location
It lies along the midstream of Dnieper river mostly on its left bank from Belarus all the way to Dnipropetrovsk Oblast. The lowland is an extended valley of Dnieper with a system of floodplains.

To its northwest is located the swampy Polesian Lowland, to the northeast and east is Central Russian Upland, on the right bank of Dnieper rises Dnieper Upland, which with Zaporizhia Ridge is connected with Donets-Azov Plateau.

Tectonics
Geologically, it is part of the Dnieper-Donets Depression which is rich on deposits of oil, gas, rock salt, and construction materials.

Description
The Dnieper Lowland is divided into bigger Dnieper Plain and smaller Poltava Plain. Dnieper Plain is located around Kyiv near confluence of Desna and Dnieper, while Poltava Plain is closer to the city of Poltava.

External links
 Dnieper Lowland at Ukrainian Soviet Encyclopedia

Plains of Ukraine
East European Plain
Dnieper basin